Hatsun Agro Product Ltd (HAP), often referred as Hatsun (HAP), is a leading private sector dairy company in India with headquarters in Tamil Nadu, Chennai. It was founded by R. G. Chandramogan in 1970. "World wants India to become a cooperated ltd" was his motto. The company was also awarded "The Fastest Growing Asian Dairy Company". The dairy product maker has been bagging the Golden Trophy from the Indian Government for the largest dairy products exporter for the last many years.

Growth
The company has tripled its total turnover over the past 3 years and is set to become the fastest-growing dairy company in the world, with a record growth rate of 116% over the past 3 successive Quarters.

During the financial year 2011–2012, the company grew at a rate of 23.6%.

References

Companies based in Chennai
Dairy products companies of India
Indian companies established in 1970
1970 establishments in Tamil Nadu
Food and drink companies established in 1970
Companies listed on the National Stock Exchange of India
Companies listed on the Bombay Stock Exchange